The Flying Circus of Physics by Jearl Walker (1975, published by John Wiley and Sons; "with Answers" in 1976; second edition in 2006), is a book that poses (and answers) about a thousand questions concerned with everyday physics.  The emphasis is strongly on phenomena that might be encountered in one's daily life.

From the preface:  "if you start thinking about physics when you are cooking, flying, or just lazing next to a stream, then I will feel the book was worthwhile".

Typically, the questions posed by the book are about phenomena that many readers will have encountered, but not thought through physically.  For example:

"Why do many candles, especially small ones, flicker and pop in the last moments before burning out?  What determines the frequency of flickering?" (3.110).  Walker's answer involves qualitative arguments of capillarity, negative feedback, and latent heat of vaporization.

Contents 
Preface
Chapter 1. Slipping Between Falling Drops. (Motion).
Chapter 2. Racing on the Ceiling, Swimming Through Syrup. (Fluids).
Chapter 3. Hiding Under the Covers, Listening for the Monsters. (Sound).
Chapter 4. Striking at the Heat in the Night. (Thermal Processes).
Chapter 5. Ducking First a Roar and Then a Flash. (Electricity and Magnetism).
Chapter 6. Splashing Colors Everywhere, Like a Rainbow. (Optics).
Chapter 7. Armadillos Dancing Against a Swollen Moon. (Vision).
Index

External links
 

1975 non-fiction books
Popular physics books